A list of notable buildings and structures in the Central African Republic:

Bangui